Ivy Hall can refer to:
Edward C. Peters House, a historic Queen Anne style house in Atlanta, Georgia.
Ivy Hall, a historic building in Princeton, New Jersey that was once home to Princeton University's short-lived law school.

See also
Ivey Hall